The Team sprint large hill/2 × 7,5 km competition at the FIS Nordic World Ski Championships 2021 was held on 6 March 2021.

Results

Ski jumping
The ski jumping part was started at 10:00.

Cross-country skiing
The cross-country skiing part was started at 15:00.

References

Team sprint large hill 2 x 7,5 km